Mariela Vallecillo (born 23 August 1970) is an Argentine alpine skier. She competed in three events at the 1988 Winter Olympics.

References

1970 births
Living people
Argentine female alpine skiers
Olympic alpine skiers of Argentina
Alpine skiers at the 1988 Winter Olympics
Place of birth missing (living people)